Buzeta  is a village in central Croatia, in the municipality/town of Glina, Sisak-Moslavina County. The village is located on the border with Bosnia and Herzegovina.

History
The settlement of Buzeta was first mentioned in 1563. Around year 1600, the village was inhabited by Christian settlers of Eastern Orthodox faith.

Culture
The wooden Eastern Orthodox church, dedicated to St. Elijah, was built around 1720 in a location further into the forest, only to be transferred to its present location in 1740. Major renovation work on the church was undertaken in 1849, the year carved under the conical roof of the shingle on the belfry. Iconostasis, which existed in the church of St. Elijah until 1995, was transferred from the church in Hajtić in the 19th century. The church was damaged in the WW2. Its post-war reconstruction, supervised by the Conservation Institute in Zagreb, included restoration of the church foundations. The icons in the church included the icon of Saint Dimitry dating back to 1810, and icons of St. George and St. Eliah. The church of St. Elijah, which in many respects is the most valuable wooden Eastern Orthodox church in the region of Banija, was set on fire during the Croatian military operation Storm in early August 1995. According to the witness accounts, the church was burt down by the members of the Army of Bosnia and Herzegovina.

Demographics
According to the 2011 census, the village of Buzeta had 67 inhabitants. This represents 17.80% of its pre-war population according to the 1991 census.

Population by ethnicity 
 

Note: Data for years 1890 and 1900 includes data for former settlements of Donja Buzeta and Gornja Buzeta.

References

External links

Populated places in Sisak-Moslavina County
Serb communities in Croatia
Glina, Croatia